Muhidin Čoralić (born 30 May 1968) is a retired Bosnian-Herzegovinian football player and is now living in the west of Germany with his wife and three children.

Club career
After beginning his career with FK Sarajevo, he moved to FK Zemun where, accepting the loan in 1990-91 to FK Bor, he stayed until 1993. It was then that he moved to Germany where he signed with Alemannia Aachen where he played until 1995. Before retiring, he also played with lower league German clubs SC Jülich 1910 and Bonner SC.

References

External links
 Profile in Alemannia Aachen official website
 
 

1968 births
Living people
People from Janja
Association football midfielders
Yugoslav footballers
Bosnia and Herzegovina footballers
FK Sarajevo players
FK Zemun players
FK Bor players
Alemannia Aachen players
Bonner SC players
Yugoslav First League players
Yugoslav Second League players
Oberliga (football) players
Regionalliga players
Bosnia and Herzegovina expatriate footballers
Expatriate footballers in Germany
Bosnia and Herzegovina expatriate sportspeople in Germany